Consensus estimate is a technique for designing truthful mechanisms in a prior-free mechanism design setting. The technique was introduced for digital goods auctions and later extended to more general settings.

Suppose there is a digital good that we want to sell to a group of buyers with unknown valuations. We want to determine the price that will bring us maximum profit. Suppose we have a function that, given the valuations of the buyers, tells us the maximum profit that we can make. We can use it in the following way:
 Ask the buyers to tell their valuations.
 Calculate  - the maximum profit possible given the valuations.
Step 3 can be attained by a profit extraction mechanism, which is a truthful mechanism. However, in general the mechanism is not truthful, since the buyers can try to influence  by bidding strategically. To solve this problem, we can replace the exact  with an approximation -  - that, with high probability, cannot be influenced by a single agent.

As an example, suppose that we know that the valuation of each single agent is at most 0.1. As a first attempt of a consensus-estimate, let 
 = the value of  rounded to the nearest integer below it.

This makes  a random variable too. With probability at least 90%,  cannot be influenced by any single agent, so a mechanism that uses  is truthful with high probability.

Such random variable  is called a consensus estimate:
 "Consensus" means that, with high probability, a single agent cannot influence the outcome, so that there is an agreement between the outcomes with or without the agent.
 "Estimate" means that the random variable is near the real variable that we are interested in - the variable .

The disadvantages of using a consensus estimate are: 
 It does not give us the optimal profit - but it gives us an approximately-optimal profit.
 It is not entirely truthful - it is only "truthful with high probability" (the probability that an agent can gain from deviating goes to 0 when the number of winning agents grows).

In practice, instead of rounding down to the nearest integer, it is better to use exponential rounding - rounding down to the nearest power of some constant. In the case of digital goods, using this consensus-estimate allows us to attain at least 1/3.39 of the optimal profit, even in worst-case scenarios.

See also 
 Random-sampling mechanism - an alternative approach to prior-free mechanism design.

References 

Mechanism design